The Kongreßhalle is a concert hall located in Saarbrücken, Germany, which was designed by German architect Dieter Oesterlen. The main hall can seat 1,300 and can hold 1,800 for standing events. The Kongreßhalle opened in 1967 and was expanded and moved to new premises in 1995.

External links 
 Website of the operating company

Concert halls in Germany